Ilıca is a small town 3 km inland from the beach resort of Kumköy, near Side, on the "Turkish Riviera". The centre of Ilıca has a rural village character with old stone houses built around a central square. There are a handful of small shops, a small park, a teahouse, a weekly open market, primary school and the inevitable football ground.

To be here Arslan Zeki Demirci Sports Complex.

Populated places in Antalya Province
Manavgat District
Towns in Turkey